Nungesser Lake is a lake in northwestern Ontario, Canada. It is a wilderness lake in Kenora District, about 30 kilometres northeast of the town of Red Lake.

See also
List of lakes in Ontario

References
 National Resources Canada

Lakes of Kenora District